Matthew McCarthy (born July 30, 1996) is an Australian basketball player for BC Pärnu Sadam of the Latvian-Estonian Basketball League. He played four seasons collegiately in the United States for San Francisco before turning professionally.

College career
After graduating from Xavier College in Kew, Victoria, McCarthy committed to play for the San Francisco Dons. In his senior season, he averaged 8.7 points and 6.3 rebounds per game for San Francisco.

Professional career
On August 2, 2019, McCarthy signed his first professional contract with Donar of the Dutch Basketball League (DBL). The 2019–20 season was cancelled prematurely in March because of the COVID-19 pandemic. He averaged 7.7 points and 5.3 rebounds per game. On August 17, 2020, McCarthy signed with CSO Voluntari of the Romanian Liga Națională.

For the 2021–22 season, McCarthy signed with Vitória of the Liga Portuguesa de Basquetebol (LPB).

For the 2022-23 season, McCarthy signed with BC Pärnu Sadam of the Latvian-Estonian Basketball League.

References

External links

1996 births
Living people
Dutch Basketball League players
Donar (basketball club) players
Australian men's basketball players
Australian expatriate basketball people in the United States
Australian expatriate basketball people in the Netherlands
Centers (basketball)
San Francisco Dons men's basketball players
Basketball players from Melbourne
People educated at Xavier College
Australian expatriate basketball people in Romania
Australian expatriate basketball people in Portugal
Australian expatriate basketball people in Estonia